Richard Allen (died 22 January 1800) was an Irish politician.

Allen was the Member of Parliament for Harristown in the Irish House of Commons between 1776 and 1783.

References

Year of birth unknown
1800 deaths
Irish MPs 1776–1783
Members of the Parliament of Ireland (pre-1801) for County Kildare constituencies